The BAL All-Defensive Team is an annual Basketball Africa League (BAL) honor bestowed on the best defensive players in the league following every BAL season. The donor was introduced in the 2022 season, the second season of the league.

Key

Selections

References

All-Defensive Team